Charles Collignon (7 September 1877 in Paris - 19 July 1925) was a French fencer and Olympic champion in épée competition.

He received a gold medal in épée team at the 1908 Summer Olympics in London.

References

French male épée fencers
Olympic fencers of France
Fencers at the 1908 Summer Olympics
Olympic gold medalists for France
1877 births
1925 deaths
Fencers from Paris
Olympic medalists in fencing
Medalists at the 1908 Summer Olympics
20th-century French people